Charianthus is a genus of flowering plants belonging to the family Melastomataceae.

Its native range is Windward Islands, Leeward Island and Guyana.

Species:

Charianthus alpinus 
Charianthus coccineus 
Charianthus corymbosus 
Charianthus dominicensis 
Charianthus grenadensis 
Charianthus nodosus 
Charianthus purpureus

References

Melastomataceae
Melastomataceae genera